The CA Bar Ranch, in Chaves County, New Mexico near Mayhill, New Mexico, was built in 1886.  It was listed on the National Register of Historic Places in 1988.

It has fish-scale patterned shingles in its end gables.

It has also been known as the James Fielding Hinkle House.  It built by and for James Hinkle, who later built a home in Roswell, New Mexico in 1906, which is a contributing building in the Downtown Roswell Historic District.

In 1988, it was part of a working cattle ranch.

References

Ranches in New Mexico
National Register of Historic Places in Chaves County, New Mexico
Buildings and structures completed in 1886